Laura Vlasak Nolen (born January 13, 1977) is an American mezzo-soprano.
Born in Dallas, Nolen sang in high school, being invited to participate in the Texas All-State Choir. She received a degree in vocal performance at Texas Tech University; for her graduate studies she attended the Jacobs School of Music, where she was a pupil of Costanza Cuccaro. Her professional debut came with Cleveland Opera, when she sang the Third Lady in The Magic Flute. On January 7, 2008, she bowed at the Metropolitan Opera as Waltraute in Die Walküre. She was reengaged for the following season, returning as Waltraute and singing Inez in Il trovatore; she was also booked to cover Giulietta in The Tales of Hoffmann, the Countess in The Nose, and the Second Maidservant in Elektra. Other companies with which Nolen has performed include New York City Opera, Madison Opera, Lyric Opera of Kansas City, Dallas Opera, and Glimmerglass Opera, for whom she performed the title role in Giulio Cesare in 2008. Attracted by the blues scene in the city,  At the Wexford Festival that same year she appeared as Dorotea in Tutti in maschera. In 2011 she appeared as Ines opposite the Maria of Barbara Quintiliani in Maria Padilla with Opera Boston. In concert she has appeared with such groups as The Washington Chorus and the Honolulu Symphony Orchestra.

References

1977 births
Living people
American operatic mezzo-sopranos
21st-century American women opera singers
Texas Tech University alumni
Jacobs School of Music alumni
Musicians from Dallas
Classical musicians from Texas